This is a list of Japanese prefectures by life expectancy.

List (2015) 

Prefectures by life expectancy at birth according to Ministry of Health, Labour and Welfare of Japan. The total life expectancy is calculated out of the averages for men and women.

See also
 List of Asian countries by life expectancy

References 

Life expectancy
Japan, life expectancy
Japan,Prefectures
Life expectancy